Brevibuccidae is a family of nematodes belonging to the order Rhabditida.

Genera:
 Brevibucca Goodey, 1935
 Cuticonema Sanwal, 1959
 Tarantobelus Abolafia

References

Nematodes